Richard Hunter Gilstrap, Jr. (born April 17, 1983 in Asheville, North Carolina) is an American retired soccer player. He most recently served as the goalkeeping coach for USL Championship club Pittsburgh Riverhounds SC, who he played with for six years. He is the son of Rick Gilstrap, former running back and quarterback football player and coach, and Kiki Kirkland Gilstrap, Miss USA 1973 Miss Congeniality.

Career

Youth and amateur
Gilstrap grew up in Lexington, South Carolina, attended Lexington High School, played club soccer for the NECSA (now South Carolina United FC) Galaxy, and played college soccer at Clemson University and at the College of Charleston, where he registered a 1.16 goals allowed average (GAA) and 4 shutouts during his senior season.

During his college years Gilstrap also played with the Greenville Lions in the USL Premier Development League.

Professional
Gilstrap was drafted with the 13th overall pick in the 2006 USL-1 draft by Miami FC, and spent the season playing in the USL First Division, making five first team appearances and playing in international friendlies against teams from Spain, Brazil and Guatemala.

He transferred to the expansion Cleveland City Stars in 2007, and immediately became a fan-favorite, appearing in 20 regular season games in 2 seasons with the team, and helping them to the USL Second Division championship in 2008.

After spending the 2008-09 USL offseason playing in the South African Premier Soccer League with Maritzburg United, Gilstrap re-signed with Cleveland for a third season on April 22, 2009.

Gilstrap captained the Stars in their first USL First Division campaign in 2009. Despite their last place finish, Gilstrap finished among the top 7 goalkeepers in the league in 4 statistical categories, including saves and shutouts. He was also awarded the Stars' Community Leadership Player of the Year Award for his work with the club and community during the season.

Gilstrap played the 2010 season with the Pittsburgh Riverhounds of the USL Second Division. The team finished in 3rd place after losing to the Richmond Kickers in the semifinals of the USL-2 Playoffs. Gilstrap won the 2010 USL-2 Goalkeeper of the Year Award  and was voted First Team All-league for his efforts during the campaign. On February 9, 2011, Gilstrap signed a two-year contract extension with Pittsburgh. On 18 February 2013, Gilstrap signed another 2-year extension to play through with the Riverhounds through the 2014 USL Pro season.

On January 8, 2015, Gilstrap signed with the Carolina RailHawks for the 2015 season.

Gilstrap returned to Pittsburgh on January 7, 2016.

References

External links
 InfoSport 2006 Pro Soccer Combine profile

Living people
1983 births
Sportspeople from Asheville, North Carolina
American soccer players
Soccer players from North Carolina
American expatriate soccer players
Clemson Tigers men's soccer players
College of Charleston Cougars men's soccer players
Cleveland City Stars players
Association football goalkeepers
Greenville Lions players
Maritzburg United F.C. players
Miami FC (2006) players
Pittsburgh Riverhounds SC players
North Carolina FC players
Charlotte Independence players
USL First Division players
USL Second Division players
USL League Two players
USL Championship players
North American Soccer League players
Soccer players from South Carolina
People from Lexington, South Carolina